Ziggy Stardust was a glam alter ego of David Bowie in the early 1970s. It may refer specifically to:

 Ziggy Stardust (character)
 The Rise and Fall of Ziggy Stardust and the Spiders from Mars, often shortened to Ziggy Stardust, a 1972 concept album by David Bowie
 "Ziggy Stardust" (song), a 1972 song by David Bowie

See also
Ziggy Stardust Tour, a concert tour to promote that album and its follow-up Aladdin Sane
 Ziggy Stardust and the Spiders from Mars (film), a 1973 documentary and concert film
 Ziggy Stardust: The Motion Picture, the soundtrack of that film